Kharuzan (also Romanized as Kharūzān) is a village in Ak Rural District, Esfarvarin District, Takestan County, Qazvin Province, Iran. At the 2006 census, its population was 494, in 114 families.

References 

Populated places in Takestan County